Somena aurantiacoides is a moth in the family Erebidae. It was described by Jeremy Daniel Holloway in 1999. It is found on Borneo and Sumatra.

The length of the forewings is 10–11 mm.

References

Moths described in 1999
Lymantriinae